Dame Olga Lopes-Seale DA MBE, (26 December 1918 – 4 February 2011) was a Guyanese-born Barbados-based social and community worker, radio broadcaster and singer.

Life
Born in Guyana as Olga Lopes, she was borne to Portuguese Guyanese indentured laborers. She sang and played mandolin and had performed in Guyana and Barbados before becoming a broadcaster for Radio Demerara (where she acquired the nickname "Auntie Olga"). In 1960, she started the Radio Needy Children's Fund. She married Barbadian Dick Seale, moving to Barbados in 1963 where she continued her radio and charity work.

In Barbados, she worked for the Barbados Rediffusion Services Limited (now Starcom Network) and was active in community work. In the 1940s and 1950s she was known as "the Vera Lynn of the Caribbean". She discovered Red Plastic Bag (a Barbadian Calypsonian) and convinced Rediffusion to provide a studio for recording, launching his career. She was also involved in the creation of the Barbadian national anthem.

Death 
On 9 December 2010, Lopes-Seale fell at her home and broke her hip, suffering multiple fractures, leaving her unable to continue her charity work for the Needy Children's Fund.

She died on 4 February 2011, aged 92 at the Queen Elizabeth Hospital in Bridgetown, Barbados.

Honors 
Lopes-Seale has been honored for her work throughout the Caribbean:

 1961 Member of the Order of the British Empire
 1997 Inducted into the Caribbean Broadcasting Hall of Fame (in Suriname)
 2002 Honored by the government of Guyana as one of 11 Guyanese Barbadians for outstanding contributions
 2005 Dame of Order of St. Andrew (Barbados)
 2010 Inducted into the Barbados Association of Journalists' Hall of Fame
 2010 Theatre Guild of Guyana presented 'O' is for Olga, in tribute to the first female broadcaster in both Guyana and the Caribbean.

References

External links
 Olga Lopes Seale Collection from the University of the West Indies, Cave Hill, Saint Michael, Barbados

1918 births
2011 deaths
Barbadian radio presenters
Barbadian women radio presenters
Guyanese radio presenters
Guyanese women radio presenters
Guyanese women singers
Members of the Order of the British Empire
Starcom Network
Place of birth missing
Knights and Dames of St Andrew (Barbados)
Barbadian broadcasters
Guyanese emigrants
Immigrants to Barbados